Manpreet Kaur Brar is an Indian actress and model. She won the Miss India crown in 1995, and was the first runner-up at the 1995 Miss Universe pageant.

Early life
Manpreet was born on 9 June 1973 to a Jat Sikh family in Mizoram, India. She graduated from Lady Irwin College, Delhi and was an honours student of Community Resource Management and Extension. Manpreet was also the college president in her final year.

Career
Brar was crowned Femina Miss India Universe 1995 by the reigning Miss Universe Sushmita Sen.
She participated in the Miss Universe 1995 held in Namibia and was crowned 1st Runner-Up behind Miss USA Chelsi Smith. Upon her return to India she did several fashion shows. Brar modeled an ethnic wardrobe designed by Ritu Kumar and financed by The Times of India.

Besides winning the Femina Miss India title in 1995, she also became the first runner-up at the Miss Universe pageant the same year. She was a brand ambassador for the watch company Omega. She was also the host of the Filmfare Awards, Graviera Manhunt and AD Club awards. She hosted several TV shows like Star Miss India, BPL Oye and Mangta Hai on Channel V.

Personal life
Manpreet is married to Arjun Walia, with whom she has two children. She is an self-professed eggetarian.

Awards

References

1973 births
Femina Miss India winners
Living people
Miss Universe 1995 contestants
Punjabi people
Female models from Delhi